VqmR small RNA was discovered in Vibrio cholerae, a bacterium which can cause cholera, using differential RNA sequencing (sRNA-seq) under conditions of low and high cell density which were being used to study quorum sensing (QS). QS controls virulence and biofilm formation in Vibrio cholerae; it has been shown previously that it is directed by the Qrr sRNAs. In fact, VqmR which is highly conserved in vibrionaceae, was shown to strongly inhibit biofilm formation by repressing the  gene; it could be the link between biofilm formation and QS.

References 

Non-coding RNA